The Dunlop Grand Prix was, in 1927, the biggest cycling race in the British Empire and the richest race in the world. It was organised by the Dunlop Rubber Company which had a long history of organising bicycle races, including the Warrnambool to Melbourne, Colac to Melbourne and Goulburn to Sydney. As a result of the Dunlop Grand Prix, the Warrnambool was not held in 1927 however the Colac and Goulburn races were.

The race was held in four stages from the 14–19 November 1927, with two rest days, covering  and a description of the race was broadcast on radio station 3LO. At that time the title of Long Distance Road Champion of Australasia was awarded to the fastest time in the Warrnambool and for 1927 the title was awarded to the fastest time in the Dunlop Grand Prix.  There was a dispute between the League of Victorian Wheelmen and Melbourne Carnivals Ltd which threatened the participation of a number of cyclists, including Hubert Opperman. The dispute however was resolved a month before the event. 

The featured riders, in addition to Opperman were Percy Osborn, Jack Beasley, then holder of the  world's record, Harry Moody, NSW and Harry Watson from New Zealand. Also competing were the winners of the Warrnambool from 1926, Les Einsiedel, 1925 Esmond Williamson, and 1924 winner WF King  his father, 47-year-old WA "Buffer" King. The fastest riders from the Goulburn to Sydney were also competing, with Ken Ross from 1926  and RJ Cruise from 1925. The riders started together on the first 3 stages however on the final stage the riders left according to their accumulated time gains. In addition to the time prize, there was also a sealed handicap and a teams championship for interstate and country riders.

Race conditions 
The late 20s and early 30s were an era of transition in relation to bicycle equipment and race conditions. Areas of controversy were the use of variable gears and two sprocket wheels, single tyres, the use of butterfly or wing nuts  and the provision of outside assistance. The Dunlop Grand Prix permitted variable gears but prohibited butterfly or wing nuts and singles. The riders were required to repair their own bikes during the stage, were not able to change bicycles unless it was bona fide damaged  and no spare parts or other assistance were permitted. Similarly the riders were not permitted to accept food or drink other than from officials at feeding stations or procured by rider from established store, hotel or refreshment room.

Stages

Stage 1: Melbourne - Wangaratta 

While the pre race reports spoke of a limit of 110 riders, 59 riders faced the starter, and 52 finished. Opperman was in the lead from Healesville for the hardest climb of the stage, the Blacks Spur. Einsiedel caught Opperman on the downhill run from Narbethong to Buxton. Opperman dropped Einsiedel at Alexandra while Watson overtook Einsiedel at Benalla. The stage was won by Opperman in convincing style, 50 minutes in front of the expected time and with a 15-minute lead over second placed Watson.

The time limit for the stage was 12h 35'  and 35 riders were within the time. The last rider in was N Coates who walked the last 5 miles so he could finish, albeit 4 hours after Opperman, 1 hour 40 minutes outside the time limit. It appears the time limit was not enforced however as all 52 finishers were reported as starting stage 2.

Stage 2: Wangaratta - Bendigo 
The time limit for the stage was 10h 55'   Opperman punctured after winning the sprint at Shepparton and was 8 minutes behind the leader Moody at Rushworth with  left in the stage. Despite riding into a hot north west wind, Opperman caught Moody between Wanalta and Colbinabbin, before dropping him  from Bendigo and gaining a further 5 minutes lead on Moody by the finish. Osborn recovered from his disappointing 22nd in stage 1 to finish 3rd a further 7 minutes back.

Stage 3: Bendigo - Warrnambool 
Stage 3 was held on Thursday 17 November 1927, covering  with a time limit for the stage of 12h 15'. This was always expected to be the toughest stage of the race, however it was made even harder by a strong headwind for the final from Scarsdale to Warrnambool. Even the leading riders were 1 h 15' outside the time limit. Yet again Opperman won the stage, however Watson, Osborn and Bainbridge finished on the same time. Teddy Rodgers, in addition to punctures fell twice with severe abrasions to his hands and legs.  He ultimately finished the stage in 20h 10', long outside the time limit. Again the time limit was not enforced and he was able to ride the final stage.

Stage 4: Warrnambool - Melbourne 
The final stage on Saturday 19 November 1927 was the traditional route from Warrnambool to Melbourne covering  with a time limit of 10h 30'. The finish of the race was at the Royal Agricultural Society's Showgrounds, Flemington. An unusual feature of the stage was that the leading riders left according to their accumulated time gains, while the 20 riders at the end of the field started together, with the balance of their time to be added at the end.

The Referee described the final stage as a hollow victory for Opperman, in that, with a 45-minute start over second place Watson, only a serious accident could have prevented him winning. That assessment may be harsh given Opperman's form in the previous 3 stages and that his time on stage 4 was 26 minutes faster the Bainbridge in 2nd. The Sporting Globe reported that Opperman looked tired and stayed 1 minute at Colac, while the Australasian reported that Opperman finished "perfectly fresh".  The last rider to finish was Teddy Rodgers who had lost so much time on stage 3.

Aftermath and following events
Jack Campbell, of Melbourne Carnivals Ltd, the company which promoted events at the motordrome hosted a banquet in Opperman's honour.  Speaking at the banquet, Mr Harry James, of the Dunlop Rubber Co, announced that he was confident that the Dunlop Grand Prix would be an annual event. This did not come to pass and the next big stage races were not until 1930 with the Sydney to Melbourne and the Tour of Tasmania.  A similar event to the Dunlop Grand Prix was not held until 1934 and the staging of the Centenary 1000.

One wish that did come true was the sending of Opperman and an Australian team to the Tour de France, funded by a public subscription, organised by the Sporting Globe.  Writing after the Dunlop Grand Prix, Opperman paid tribute to 3 riders, Watson, Bainbridge and Osborn  and these were the riders selected to travel with him to France.

Notes

References

Cycle races in Australia
Cycling in Melbourne
Sports competitions in Melbourne